Luz is a metro station located between República and Sé districts, in the central region of São Paulo. This station connects the lines 1-Blue, operated by Companhia do Metropolitano de São Paulo, and 4-Yellow, operated by ViaQuatro. It also has connection with the CPTM station, which attends lines 7-Ruby and 11-Coral with no additional cost, and Line 13-Jade (Airport-Express).

Line 1-Blue

Characteristics
The station of Line 1-Blue was opened on 26 September 1975. It's an underground station with a flow distribution mezzanine and island and side platforms with structure in apparent concrete. It has a  constructed area and capacity for 40,000 passengers per hour in peak hours.

The free connection with the CPTM station started on 30 November 2004, by an initiative of the State Secretariat of Metropolitan Transports.

Line 4-Yellow

Characteristics
The station of Line 4-Yellow was originally scheduled to be opened in 2008, but was opened only on 15 September 2011 and started operating from 10a.m. to 3p.m. On 23 September, the time was increased to 9a.m. to 4 p.m. and, since 26 September, from 4:40 a.m. to midnight.

It's an underground station with side platforms. A skylight in the roof of the station allows the entrance of solar light.

Notes

References

São Paulo Metro stations
Railway stations opened in 1975
1975 establishments in Brazil
Railway stations opened in 2011